Partial general elections were held in Luxembourg on 6 June 1948, electing 26 of the 51 seats in the Chamber of Deputies in the centre and north of the country. The Christian Social People's Party won 9 of the 26 seats, reducing its total number of seats from 25 to 22.

Results

References

Chamber of Deputies (Luxembourg) elections
Legislative election, 1948
Luxembourg
1948 in Luxembourg
June 1948 events in Europe